The 2012 United States Senate election in Vermont was held on November 6, 2012. Incumbent Independent U.S. Senator Bernie Sanders won re-election to a second term in a landslide, capturing nearly three-quarters of the vote.

Background 
Then-U.S. representative Bernie Sanders, an independent and self-described democratic socialist, had been elected with 65% of the vote in the 2006 U.S. senatorial election in Vermont.

Democratic primary

Candidates 
Bernie Sanders, incumbent U.S. Senator

Sanders also received the nomination of the Vermont Progressive Party, but declined both the Democratic and Progressive nominations after the primary.

Republican primary

Candidates

Declared 
 John MacGovern, former Massachusetts State Representative
 H. Brooke Paige, former CEO of Remmington News Service

Declined 
 Kevin Dorn, former Secretary of the Vermont Agency of Commerce and Community Development
 Jim Douglas, former Governor
 Thom Lauzon, Mayor of Barre
 Tom Salmon, state auditor

Results

General election

Candidates 
 Peter Diamondstone (Liberty Union), perennial candidate
 Cris Ericson (U.S. Marijuana), perennial candidate (also running for Governor)
 Laurel LaFramboise (VoteKISS)
 John MacGovern (Republican), former Massachusetts State Representative
 Peter Moss (Peace and Prosperity)
 Bernie Sanders (I), incumbent U.S. Senator

Predictions

Debates 
Complete video of debate, October 25, 2012 - C-SPAN

Polling

Results

References

External links 
 Elections and Campaign Finance Division at the Vermont Secretary of State
 Campaign contributions at OpenSecrets.org
 Outside spending at Sunlight Foundation
 Candidate issue positions at On the Issues

Official campaign websites (Archived)
 Cris Ericson for U.S. Senate
 John MacGovern for U.S. Senate
 Brooke Paige for U.S. Senate
 Bernie Sanders for U.S. Senate

United States Senate
Vermont
2012
Bernie Sanders